Yannick Carter (born February 2, 1984) is a former professional Canadian football linebacker. He was drafted in the third round of the 2007 CFL Draft by the Saskatchewan Roughriders. Carter also played 4 seasons with the Hamilton Tiger-Cats. He played CIS Football at Wilfrid Laurier.

Professional career

Saskatchewan Roughriders
Yannick Carter was drafted by the Roughriders in the 3rd round of the 2007 CFL Draft.

Hamilton Tiger-Cats
On May 1, 2009, Carter was traded along with Brandon Myles and third round pick in the 2009 CFL Draft to the Hamilton Tiger-Cats for Sasha Glavic and a third round pick.

Calgary Stampeders
After not being re-signed by the Tiger-Cats following the 2012 CFL season Carter signed with the Calgary Stampeders.

References

External links
Hamilton Tiger-Cats bio
Calgary Stampeders bio 

1984 births
Living people
Canadian football people from Toronto
Wilfrid Laurier Golden Hawks football players
Canadian football linebackers
Saskatchewan Roughriders players
Hamilton Tiger-Cats players
Calgary Stampeders players
Players of Canadian football from Ontario
People from Pickering, Ontario